Virginio Bettini (29 June 1942 – 21 September 2020) was an Italian politician who served as a Member of the European Parliament from 1989–1994.

References

1942 births
2020 deaths
MEPs for Italy 1989–1994